Miguel Nicolás Deynes Soto (born July 5, 1936, in Moca, Puerto Rico) is a Puerto Rican politician and former Senator. He was a member of the Senate of Puerto Rico from 1973 to 1993.

Early years and studies

Miguel Deynes Soto was born on July 5, 1936 in Moca, Puerto Rico. He studied his elementary and high school in his hometown. Deynes then went to study to the University of Puerto Rico at Mayagüez where he received a Bachelor's degree in Agricultural Sciences in 1955. Deynes continued studying at Mayagüez, and received his Master's degree in Economy and Education in 1970. Finally, he received his Juris doctor from the Interamerican University of Puerto Rico School of Law.

Professional career

Deynes Soto started working as an Agricultural Agent for the Agricultural Extension Service in the west region. In 1966, he worked as Regional Director of the Department of Commerce of Mayagüez, and in 1969, he was named Deputy Director of the Local Commerce Program at the San Juan Central Offices. In 1970, he worked for the University of Puerto Rico as Director of the Technical Information Center.

Political career: 1972-1996

En las elecciones de 1972 fue elegido Senador por el Distrito Mayagüez- Aguadilla y reelegido hasta el 1992. Presidió la Comisión de Hacienda de ese Cuerpo legislativo, así como la Comisión Especial Permanente de los Sistemas de Retiro del Senado.
En 1989 fue elegido Vicepresidente del Senado. Colaboró con artículos sobre diversos temas en el Periódico “El Mundo”.

Deynes began his political career in 1972 when he was elected as Senator for the District of Mayagüez. He was reelected five consecutive times, the last one being at the 1988 general election. That term he was chosen as President pro tempore by Miguel Hernández Agosto.

During his last term, Deynes was forced to leave his Senate seat after it was discovered he was using his funds inappropriately. He eventually lost his legal license.

Personal life

Deynes Soto is married to Cándida Vargas Pérez. They have four children together: Dalies Jeannette, Miguel A., Itza B. and Miguel Alberto.

See also

List of Puerto Ricans
Senate of Puerto Rico

References

External links
Biografía Miguel Deynes on SenadoPR

1936 births
Interamerican University of Puerto Rico alumni
Members of the Senate of Puerto Rico
People from Moca, Puerto Rico
Presidents pro tempore of the Senate of Puerto Rico
Living people